Jordan L. Gruzen (1934–2015) was an American architect.

Gruzen was born in Jersey City, New Jersey, to B. Sumner Gruzen, an architect. He graduated from the MIT School of Architecture and Planning in 1957. He then attended the University of Pennsylvania, graduating with a Master of Architecture degree in 1961. He worked on projects around New York City. In 1962 he joined his father's firm, Kelly & Gruzen. In 1967 he and another associate, Peter Samton, became partners, and the firm was renamed Gruzen & Partners. After the death of the elder Gruzen it became the Gruzen Partnership, and later Gruzen Samton. The firm was acquired by IBI Group in 2009.

References 

Architects from New Jersey
Architects from New York City
20th-century American architects
21st-century American architects
1934 births
2015 deaths
MIT School of Architecture and Planning alumni